Radna is a settlement in the Municipality of Sevnica in east-central Slovenia. It lies at the confluence of the Mirna River and the Sava River in the historical region of Lower Carniola. The municipality is now included in the Lower Sava Statistical Region.

The village was historically named Tariška vas. There is a large 17th-century mansion in the settlement.

References

External links
Radna at Geopedia

Populated places in the Municipality of Sevnica